Daniel Londas (born 17 May 1954 in Fort-de-France, Martinique) is a French former boxer who competed for France in the men's featherweight competition at the 1980 Summer Olympics in Moscow. After a first-round bye, he was eliminated in the second round by Soviet Viktor Rybakov (0-5).

Londas then became a professional, recording 58 wins (25 knockouts), 9 losses and 1 no-decision. In 1992 he took the WBO Junior Lightweight title.

Olympic Results
Below is the Olympic record of Daniel Londas, a French featherweight boxer who competed at the 1980 Moscow Olympics

 Round of 64: bye
 Round of 32: lost to Viktor Rybakov (Soviet Union) by decision, 0-5.

See also
List of super-featherweight boxing champions

External links

sports-reference

1954 births
Living people
French people of Martiniquais descent
Olympic boxers of France
Boxers at the 1980 Summer Olympics
Super-featherweight boxers
Lightweight boxers
World super-featherweight boxing champions
World Boxing Organization champions
French male boxers
Mediterranean Games gold medalists for France
Mediterranean Games medalists in boxing
Competitors at the 1979 Mediterranean Games
European Boxing Union champions